Octon is a hamlet, and shrunken medieval village in the East Riding of Yorkshire, England.

History

Octon is recorded in the 11th-century Domesday Book as "Ocheton". The village contained a chapel dedicated to St. Michael (noted in 1327). After around 1400 no records exist relating to the chapel, and the village is thought likely to have been depopulated as a result of the Black Death.

By the 19th century the village was reduced to a small farming hamlet. The extent of the hamlet remained unexpanded throughout the 19th and 20th centuries.

The modern village is at the same location as the reduced medieval village; earthworks of the medieval church and village were scheduled as an ancient monument in 1994. The 'Old farmhouse' at Glebe farm, Octon, a cruck framed longhouse dating from the 17th century is a Grade II* listed building.

Geography
The village includes a large house 'Octon Manor'.

Notable people
Thomas Lamplugh, archbishop, was born in Octon in 1614.

References

Sources

External links

Villages in the East Riding of Yorkshire
Deserted medieval villages in the East Riding of Yorkshire
Thwing and Octon